Kotsifali is a red Greek wine grape that
is indigenous to the island of Crete. It is mainly grown in the Heraklion regional unit and sporadically on the Cyclades. The grape alone gives moderately red wine with high alcohol content and rich flavor. It is often blended with Mandilaria, yielding a
ruby-colored dry wine with pleasant taste and aroma that requires minimal aging.

References

Red wine grape varieties 
Grape varieties of Greece
Crete